Opuntia megarrhiza Rose is a species of plant in the family Cactaceae. It is endemic to the state of San Luís Potosí in northeastern Mexico.

It is known only from 5 populations, around the summits of La Trinidad and Álvarez Mountain Ranges, in San Luis Potosí, northeastern Mexico. Its natural habitat is subtropical or tropical dry lowland grassland.

It is an endangered species, threatened by habitat loss, grazing, and harvest for traditional medicinal uses.

Synonyms
Opuntia megarrhiza Rose, Contr. U.S. Natl. Herb. 10:126. 1906.
Opuntia macrorhiza var. potosina Hernández-Valencia, Acta Cientifica Potosina 10:155-162. 1988.

References

megarrhiza
Cacti of Mexico
Endemic flora of Mexico
Flora of San Luis Potosí
Endangered biota of Mexico
Endangered flora of North America
Taxonomy articles created by Polbot